Accelerate is the seventh album released by British-Australian singer-songwriter Peter Andre.

Background
The album was released on 1 November 2010, preceded by the lead single, Defender. To create a fresh & uniquely British sounding record, Peter enlisted the help of modern music producers Taio Cruz, Guy Chambers & Labrinth, as well as the emerging talents of Dantae Johnson & Marcus Jay, who collectively wrote & produced a large portion of the album at MADM Studios owned and managed by writer producer Anthony Goldsbrough AKA Goldzbrough. The album features ten tracks as standard – however, two supermarkets are offering retailer-exclusive editions of the album, each packaged with one different bonus track and poster per supermarket. Thus, fans are encouraged to find and collect both versions of the album. The album peaked at No. 10 on the UK Albums Chart, with sales of over 125,000 copies. The album's second single, "Perfect Night", was confirmed for release on 2 July 2011. The video premiered on 9 June 2011.

Reception
The Allmusic review by Jon O'Brien awarded the album 3.5 stars stating "The synth-heavy uptempo tracks "Kiss and Tell" and "After the Love" are reminiscent of Jay Sean's transatlantic club anthems, "XLR8" and "Under My Skin" echo the funk-pop of Justin Timberlake's last effort, while there are songs co-penned by the likes of chart-toppers Labyrinth and Taio Cruz. Only lead single "Defender," an homage to Janet Jackson's "Rhythm Nation," harks back to the formulaic, watered-down R&B of his previous work. Even the ballads, usually the nadir of any Peter Andre album, are dragged kicking and screaming into the new decade, thanks to the clattering beats of the Ryan Tedder-inspired "Perfect Night" and the Ne-Yo-esque seductive slow jams, "Wondergirl" and "Prisoner." Without the baggage of his naff early singles and tabloid headlines, Accelerate would undoubtedly earn more credibility and acclaim than it will inevitably receive.".

Track listing

Charts

Certifications

References

Peter Andre albums
2010 albums